The 1999 Delaware Fightin' Blue Hens football team represented the University of Delaware as a member of the Atlantic 10 Conference (A-10) during the 1999 NCAA Division I-AA football season. Led by 34th-year head coach Tubby Raymond, the Fightin' Blue Hens compiled an overall record of 7–4 with a mark of 5–3 in conference play, tying for fourth place in the A-10. The team played home games at Delaware Stadium in Newark, Delaware.

Schedule

Roster

References

Delaware
Delaware Fightin' Blue Hens football seasons
Delaware Fightin' Blue Hens football